Kirsten Rudgeley (born 2001) is an Australian professional golfer who plays on the Ladies European Tour. In 2022, she won The Athena Golf Challenge on the WPGA Tour of Australasia.

Early life and amateur career
Rudgeley was born in London, England and relocated with her family to Perth, Western Australia when she was four. Her father introduced her to golf when she was 7 years old, but she didn't consider herself a serious golfer until she represented Western Australia at age 14.

Domestically, Rudgeley was runner-up at the 2020 Riversdale Cup and won the Port Phillip Open Amateur, Victorian Amateur, North Shore Classic and the Rene Erichsen Salver, plus the Western Australia Amateur three times.

In 2021, she won the Helen Holm Scottish Women's Open Championship and the English Women's Amateur Championship, before qualifying for the 2021 Women's British Open at Carnoustie Golf Links in Scotland, her first major. She was also runner-up at the Australian Women's Amateur and finished second behind Su Oh at the TPS Victoria, a WPGA Tour of Australasia event.  She finished in a tie for seventh at the Women's Victorian Open, a Ladies European Tour event, and received the Golf Australia Women's Order of Merit award for 2021.

Rudgeley beat Grace Kim in the final to win The Athena Golf Challenge amongst a field of professionals on the 2022 WPGA Tour of Australasia. 

She was Australia's sole representative at the 2022 Augusta National Women's Amateur, where she finished 8th. She received the Karrie Webb Scholarship for the second straight year, as Australia's leading female amateur.

She recorded a career high of 24th in the World Amateur Golf Rankings.

Professional career
Rudgeley turned professional after earning her Ladies European Tour card for 2023 by finishing T9 at Q-School.

Amateur wins
2017 Western Australia Amateur
2019 Western Australia Amateur
2020 Western Australia Amateur, Port Phillip Open Amateur and Victorian Women's Amateur Championship
2021 Rene Erichsen Salver, North Shore Classic, Helen Holm Scottish Women's Open Championship, English Women's Amateur Championship
2022 Avondale Amateur

Source:

Professional wins (1)

WPGA Tour of Australasia wins (1)

Team appearances
Amateur
Australian Girls' Interstate Teams Matches (representing Western Australia): 2017, 2018
Australian Women's Interstate Teams Matches (representing Western Australia): 2017, 2018, 2019, 2022
Junior Golf World Cup (representing Australia): 2019
Espirito Santo Trophy (representing Australia): 2022
Queen Sirikit Cup (representing Australia): 2022

References

External links

Australian female golfers
European Tour golfers
ALPG Tour golfers
Sportspeople from Western Australia
English emigrants to Australia
2001 births
Living people